The Truth About Jane is a Lifetime Original Movie directed by Lee Rose and starring Stockard Channing, Ellen Muth, Kelly Rowan, Jenny O'Hara and RuPaul (credited under RuPaul Charles). The film is about a teenage girl named Jane (Muth) who struggles not only with her sexuality, but with a mother (Channing) who refuses to accept her. It first aired on TV on August 7, 2000. The film was nominated for several awards, including Outstanding TV Movie by GLAAD, Outstanding Performance by a Female Actor in a Television Movie or Miniseries (Channing) Screen Actors Guild, and Original Long Form by WGA.

Plot
Teenage Jane is struggling with her sexuality. Her friends notice her lack of interest in boys. Jane becomes friends with a new girl named Taylor, who Jane sees as "different, smarter, wiser." Eventually, Jane and Taylor share their first kiss, and Jane wonders to herself if kissing Taylor made her gay and the two become an official couple. After Jane and Taylor have sex for the first time, Jane tells Taylor that "it was a mistake" and that she's not gay. Hurt, Taylor breaks up with Jane.

Jane meets with her English teacher/guidance counselor Ms. Walcott and confesses that she has lost her virginity, not mentioning that it was to another girl. Ms. Walcott suggests that Jane write Taylor a note to express how she feels and why she acted the way she did. Jane does. A few days later, Taylor shows up at her house and the two share a kiss, unaware of Jane's brother watching them through her partially open bedroom door. Jane's brother outs Jane and Taylor and the news spreads quickly. Jane comes out to her parents, who send her to therapy.

The sneaking around becomes too much for Taylor and she breaks up with Jane. Ms. Walcott stops to comfort Jane on seeing her crying. Ms. Walcott comes out to Jane as a lesbian and tells her the story of her first time falling in love and being dumped and Jane starts to feel better. However, during lunch at school, her old friends begin taunting her and Jane attacks one of them, causing her to get suspended.

Following the suspension, Janice hears a group of boys making homophobic remarks about Jane. Janice tries to confront her daughter and claims that what Jane is doing isn't normal. Jane angrily begins to rant that gay people are perfectly normal, unintentionally outing Ms. Walcott in the process. Janice confronts Ms. Walcott at the school, demanding that she stay away from her daughter and threatening to go to the school board if she doesn't.

When Jane's parents decide to send her away to boarding school, Jane runs away to Ms. Walcott's house. Jane apologizes to Ms. Walcott for outing her and tells her that she is considering suicide. Ms. Walcott goes to Jane's parents and tells them that Jane is considering suicide. Janice and Jane reconcile, despite Janice still being uncomfortable with her daughter's sexuality. They begin attending PFLAG (Parents, Families, and Friends of Lesbians and Gays) meetings and gradually, Janice learns to accept Jane for who she is.

The film ends with a dedication to Matthew Shepard and to "all the men & women who love differently".

Cast

Reception
The film have a score of 68%, based on 37 critics' reviews on Cinafilm as well as 64 out of a 100 on Moviefone.com.

References

External links
 The Truth About Jane on IMDB.com
 The Truth About Jane on AfterEllen.com

2000 television films
2000 films
American LGBT-related television films
Lesbian-related films
Lesbian-related television shows
Lifetime (TV network) films
Films scored by Terence Blanchard
2000 LGBT-related films
Films directed by Lee Rose (director)
2000s English-language films
2000s American films